This is a list of the Hong Kong national football team results from 1990 to 2009.

1990

1991
No any matches were played in 1991.

1992

1993

1994

1995

1996

1997

1998

1999

2000

2001

2002
No any matches were played in 2002.

2003

2004

2005

2006

2007

2008

2009

Notes

References

1990
1990s in Hong Kong sport
2000s in Hong Kong sport